Jacopo Tiepolo (died 19 July 1249), also known as Giacomo Tiepolo, was Doge of Venice from 1229 to 1249. He had previously served as the first Venetian Duke of Crete, and two terms as Podestà of Constantinople (1218-1220 and 1224-1227). During his first term, following the capture and mysterious end of Peter of Courtenay, Tiepolo acted as de facto ruler of the Latin Empire, negotiating treaties on behalf of the Empire with Egypt and the Seljuk Turks.

History 
Probably born in the latter part of the twelfth century, Jacopo assumed the post of Duke of Crete (Italian: duca di Candia) around the year 1212. During his tenure, Venetian dominion over Crete was challenged considerably by the Greek locals, culminating eventually in its capture at the hands of Marco Sanudo. His success, however, was short-lived, as a Venetian fleet soon arrived, forcing him to evacuate the island.

Jacopo was elected Doge on 6 March 1229, his predecessor Pietro Ziani having abdicated the month before. At the election, a stalemate was reached between Jacopo and his rival Marino Dandolo, both of them having twenty votes each. This was rectified by drawing lots, leading to Tiepolo's victory. This is thought to have sparked the feud between the Dandolo, who were an old aristocratic family, and the Tiepolo, who were seen as nouveau-riches. In an attempt to prevent the recurrence of a split vote in future elections, the number of electors was increased from forty to forty-one. Prior to ascending the ducal throne, Tiepolo also had to sign a traditional promissione, seriously limiting his powers.

Despite Emperor Frederick II's cordial visit to Venice in 1232, relations between the Empire and the Republic deteriorated. Consequently, in 1239, Venice joined the Lombard League and fought against Ezzelino III da Romano, a powerful ally of the Emperor. In the subsequent fights the Doge's son, Pietro Tiepolo, was captured at the Battle of Cortenuova on 27 November 1237. He was later taken to the Emperor's castle at Trani and hanged, worsening relations further. 

Jacopo Tiepolo's dogate brought significant change to Venice. In 1242 the Doge produced Statutum novum, by which Venetian civil law was codified in five books of statutes. This process of codification had been first initiated by Enrico Dandolo some fifty years earlier. Additional to this, Tiepolo had granted land in 1234 to the Dominican and Franciscan orders, upon which two churches were built. These were the Basilica di San Giovanni e Paolo ('San Zanipolo') and the Basilica di Santa Maria Gloriosa dei Frari.

Tiepolo abdicated in 1249 and retired thereafter to his private residence at Sant' Agostino, in San Polo. Andrea Dandolo's Chronicon Venetum records that he vacated the Doge's Palace on 2 March and died on 19 July. He was buried in the church of San Zanipolo.

He married twice, firstly to Maria Storlato, and following her death in 1240 to Valdrada of Sicily. Maria bore him three children: Lorenzo, who served as Doge from 1268 to 1275; the aforementioned Pietro, podestà of Padua; and a third son named Giovanni. Valdrada bore him two children, both young at the time of their father's death, and whose identities remain unknown. She outlived her husband by around three years.

References

13th-century Doges of Venice
1249 deaths
Year of birth unknown
Latin Empire people
Dukes of Crete
Burials at Santi Giovanni e Paolo, Venice